The 1979 Campionati Internazionali di Sicilia, also known as the Palermo Grand Prix or Palermo Open, was a men's tennis tournament played on outdoor clay courts in Palermo, Italy that was part of the 1979 Colgate-Palmolive Grand Prix. It was the inaugural edition of the tournament and took place from 17 September until 23 September 1979. First-seeded Björn Borg won the singles title.

Finals

Singles
 Björn Borg defeated  Corrado Barazzutti 6–4, 6–0, 6–4
 It was Borg's 10th singles title of the year and the 49th of his career.

Doubles
 Peter McNamara /  Paul McNamee defeated  Ismail El Shafei /  John Feaver 7–5, 7–6

References

External links
 ITF tournament edition details

Campionati Internazionali di Sicilia
Campionati Internazionali di Sicilia
Campionati Internazionali di Sicilia